is one of the original 40 throws of Judo as developed by Jigoro Kano.  It belongs to the third group, Sankyo, of the traditional throwing list, Gokyo (no waza), of Kodokan Judo.  It is also part of the current 67 Throws of Kodokan Judo.  It is classified as a foot technique, Ashi-waza.

Similar techniques, variants, and aliases 
English aliases:

Similar techniques:

 De Ashi Harai: sweeping of one foot either to the front or sideways.
 Sasae Tsuri Komi Ashi: Blocking of the foot to prevent it from stepping forward in contrast to the sweeping motion backwards in Harai Tsuri Komi Ashi.

Further reading

See also
The Canon Of Judo

References

Judo technique
Throw (grappling)
Grappling hold
Grappling positions
Martial art techniques